Wightia is the scientific name of two genera of organisms and may refer to:

Wightia (plant), a genus of plants in the order Lamiales
Wightia (pterosaur), a genus of pterosaurs in the family Tapejaridae